Esfid may refer to:
 Esfid, North Khorasan
 Esfid, Qom